This is a partial list of butterflies of Uganda. About 1,235 species are known from Uganda, 31 of which are endemic.

Papilionidae

Papilioninae

Papilionini
Papilio antimachus parva Jackson, 1956
Papilio zalmoxis Hewitson, 1864
Papilio nireus nireus Linnaeus, 1758
Papilio nireus lyaeus Doubleday, 1845
Papilio nireus pseudonireus Felder & Felder, 1865
Papilio charopus montuosus Joicey & Talbot, 1927
Papilio chrapkowskoides chrapkowskoides Storace, 1952
Papilio chrapkowskoides nurettini Koçak, 1983
Papilio interjectana Vane-Wright, 1995
Papilio sosia debilis Storace, 1951
Papilio cynorta Fabricius, 1793
Papilio plagiatus Aurivillius, 1898
Papilio dardanus dardanus Brown, 1776
Papilio dardanus meseres Carpenter, 1948
Papilio phorcas congoanus Rothschild, 1896
Papilio phorcas ruscoei Krüger, 1928
Papilio rex mimeticus Rothschild, 1897
Papilio zenobia Fabricius, 1775
Papilio mechowi mechowi Dewitz, 1881
Papilio mechowi whitnalli Neave, 1904
Papilio demodocus Esper, [1798]
Papilio echerioides joiceyi Gabriel, 1945
Papilio jacksoni jacksoni Sharpe, 1891
Papilio jacksoni ruandana Le Cerf, 1924
Papilio nobilis nobilis Rogenhofer, 1891
Papilio nobilis crippsianus Stoneham, 1936
Papilio hesperus Westwood, 1843
Papilio lormieri neocrocea Koçak, 1983
Papilio lormieri semlikana Le Cerf, 1924
Papilio leucotaenia Rothschild, 1908
Papilio mackinnoni Sharpe, 1891

Leptocercini
Graphium antheus (Cramer, 1779)
Graphium policenes (Cramer, 1775)
Graphium junodi (Trimen, 1893)
Graphium colonna (Ward, 1873)
Graphium gudenusi (Rebel, 1911)
Graphium angolanus baronis (Ungemach, 1932)
Graphium ridleyanus (White, 1843)
Graphium leonidas (Fabricius, 1793)
Graphium latreillianus theorini (Aurivillius, 1881)
Graphium philonoe whalleyi (Talbot, 1929)
Graphium almansor escherichi (Gaede, 1915)
Graphium almansor uganda (Lathy, 1906)
Graphium ucalegon schoutedeni Berger, 1950

Pieridae

Pseudopontiinae
Pseudopontia paradoxa (Felder & Felder, 1869)
Pseudopontia gola Sáfián & Mitter, 2010

Coliadinae
Eurema brigitta (Stoll, [1780])
Eurema mandarinula (Holland, 1892)
Eurema hapale (Mabille, 1882)
Eurema hecabe solifera (Butler, 1875)
Eurema senegalensis (Boisduval, 1836)
Catopsilia florella (Fabricius, 1775)
Colias electo pseudohecate Berger, 1940

Pierinae
Colotis antevippe zera (Lucas, 1852)
Colotis aurigineus (Butler, 1883)
Colotis aurora evarne (Klug, 1829)
Colotis auxo (Lucas, 1852)
Colotis celimene (Lucas, 1852)
Colotis chrysonome (Klug, 1829)
Colotis danae pseudacaste (Butler, 1876)
Colotis elgonensis elgonensis (Sharpe, 1891)
Colotis elgonensis basilewskyi Berger, 1956
Colotis euippe complexivus (Butler, 1886)
Colotis evenina xantholeuca (Sharpe, 1904)
Colotis halimede (Klug, 1829)
Colotis hetaera ankolensis Stoneham, 1940
Colotis hetaera aspasia (Ungemach, 1932)
Colotis pallene (Hopffer, 1855)
Colotis phisadia vagus d'Abrera, 1980
Colotis protomedia (Klug, 1829)
Colotis regina (Trimen, 1863)
Colotis vesta hanningtoni (Butler, 1883)
Colotis vesta princeps Talbot, 1939
Eronia cleodora Hübner, 1823
Pinacopterix eriphia melanarge (Butler, 1886)
Pinacopterix eriphia wittei Berger, 1940
Nepheronia argia argia (Fabricius, 1775)
Nepheronia argia argolisia (Stoneham, 1957)
Nepheronia pharis pharis (Boisduval, 1836)
Nepheronia pharis silvanus (Stoneham, 1957)
Nepheronia thalassina sinalata (Suffert, 1904)
Nepheronia thalassina verulanus (Ward, 1871)
Leptosia alcesta inalcesta Bernardi, 1959
Leptosia alcesta pseudonuptilla Bernardi, 1959
Leptosia hybrida somereni Bernardi, 1959
Leptosia marginea (Mabille, 1890)
Leptosia nupta pseudonupta Bernardi, 1959
Leptosia wigginsi (Dixey, 1915)

Pierini
Appias epaphia (Cramer, [1779])
Appias phaola intermedia Dufrane, 1948
Appias sabina (Felder & Felder, [1865])
Appias sylvia nyasana (Butler, 1897)
Pontia helice johnstonii (Crowley, 1887)
Mylothris agathina richlora Suffert, 1904
Mylothris alberici Dufrane, 1940
Mylothris asphodelus Butler, 1888
Mylothris bernice berenicides Holland, 1896
Mylothris chloris clarissa Butler, 1888
Mylothris citrina orientalis Talbot, 1946
Mylothris continua Talbot, 1944
Mylothris croceus Butler, 1896
Mylothris hilara goma Berger, 1981
Mylothris jacksoni Sharpe, 1891
Mylothris kiwuensis rhodopoides Talbot, 1944
Mylothris kiwuensis katera Berger, 1979
Mylothris mafuga Berger, 1981
Mylothris nubila somereni Talbot, 1946
Mylothris rhodope (Fabricius, 1775)
Mylothris ruandana Strand, 1909
Mylothris rubricosta (Mabille, 1890)
Mylothris rueppellii tirikensis Neave, 1904
Mylothris schumanni uniformis Talbot, 1944
Mylothris similis noel Talbot, 1944
Mylothris sjostedti hecqui Berger, 1952
Mylothris subsolana Hecq, 2001
Mylothris yulei latimargo Joicey & Talbot, 1921
Dixeia dixeyi (Neave, 1904)
Dixeia doxo costata Talbot, 1943
Dixeia orbona vidua (Butler, 1900)
Belenois aurota (Fabricius, 1793)
Belenois calypso minor Talbot, 1943
Belenois calypso crawshayi Butler, 1894
Belenois creona severina (Stoll, 1781)
Belenois gidica abyssinica (Lucas, 1852)
Belenois raffrayi extendens (Joicey & Talbot, 1927)
Belenois rubrosignata kongwana Talbot, 1943
Belenois solilucis loveni (Aurivillius, 1921)
Belenois subeida subeida (Felder & Felder, 1865)
Belenois subeida sylvander Grose-Smith, 1890
Belenois sudanensis katalensis Berger, 1981
Belenois theora laeta (Weymer, 1903)
Belenois theuszi (Dewitz, 1889)
Belenois thysa meldolae Butler, 1872
Belenois victoria victoria Dixey, 1915
Belenois victoria schoutedeni Berger, 1953
Belenois zochalia agrippinides (Holland, 1896)

Lycaenidae

Miletinae

Liphyrini
Euliphyra leucyania (Hewitson, 1874)
Aslauga karamoja (Libert, 1994) (endemic)
Aslauga lamborni Bethune-Baker, 1914
Aslauga marshalli Butler, 1899
Aslauga pandora Druce, 1913
Aslauga purpurascens Holland, 1890

Miletini
Megalopalpus metaleucus Karsch, 1893
Megalopalpus simplex Röber, 1886
Megalopalpus zymna (Westwood, 1851)
Spalgis jacksoni Stempffer, 1967
Spalgis lemolea Druce, 1890
Lachnocnema bibulus (Fabricius, 1793)
Lachnocnema pseudobibulus Libert, 1996
Lachnocnema sosia Libert, 1996
Lachnocnema durbani Trimen & Bowker, 1887
Lachnocnema abyssinica Libert, 1996
Lachnocnema triangularis Libert, 1996
Lachnocnema jacksoni Stempffer, 1967
Lachnocnema emperamus (Snellen, 1872)
Lachnocnema divergens Gaede, 1915
Lachnocnema vuattouxi Libert, 1996
Lachnocnema reutlingeri perspicua Libert, 1996
Lachnocnema luna Druce, 1910
Lachnocnema brunea Libert, 1996
Lachnocnema magna Aurivillius, 1895
Lachnocnema exiguus Holland, 1890
Lachnocnema disrupta Talbot, 1935

Poritiinae

Liptenini
Alaena caissa kagera Talbot, 1935
Alaena subrubra Bethune-Baker, 1915
Ptelina carnuta (Hewitson, 1873)
Pentila alba Dewitz, 1886
Pentila cloetensi albida Hawker-Smith, 1933
Pentila cloetensi catauga Rebel, 1914
Pentila glagoessa (Holland, 1893)
Pentila inconspicua Druce, 1910
Pentila pauli clarensis Neave, 1903
Pentila tachyroides Dewitz, 1879
Pentila umangiana connectens Hulstaert, 1924
Liptenara hiendlmayri (Dewitz, 1887)
Telipna sulpitia Hulstaert, 1924
Telipna aurivillii jefferyi Jackson, 1969
Telipna kayonza Jackson, 1969 (endemic)
Telipna citrimaculata neavei Bethune-Baker, 1926
Telipna citrimaculata victoriae Libert, 2005
Telipna sheffieldi Bethune-Baker, 1926 (endemic)
Telipna sanguinea depuncta Talbot, 1937
Telipna consanguinea consanguinea Rebel, 1914
Telipna consanguinea ugandae Behune-Baker, 1926
Telipna nyanza nyanza Neave, 1904
Telipna nyanza katangae Stempffer, 1961
Ornipholidotos ugandae Stempffer, 1947
Ornipholidotos teroensis Stempffer, 1957
Ornipholidotos katangae reducta Libert, 2005
Ornipholidotos amieti angulata Libert, 2005
Ornipholidotos overlaeti intermedia Libert, 2005
Ornipholidotos gemina fournierae Libert, 2005
Ornipholidotos josianae Libert, 2005 (endemic)
Ornipholidotos jacksoni Stempffer, 1961
Ornipholidotos ntebi (Bethune-Baker, 1906)
Ornipholidotos latimargo (Hawker-Smith, 1933)
Ornipholidotos paradoxa orientis Libert, 2005
Ornipholidotos peucetia (Hewitson, 1866)
Mimacraea krausei krausei Dewitz, 1889
Mimacraea krausei poultoni Neave, 1904
Mimacraea landbecki Druce, 1910
Mimacraea marshalli Trimen, 1898
Mimacraea eltringhami Druce, 1912
Mimeresia debora barnsi (Hawker-Smith, 1933)
Mimeresia dinora discirubra (Talbot, 1937)
Mimeresia drucei ugandae (Stempffer, 1954)
Mimeresia favillacea griseata (Talbot, 1937)
Mimeresia moreelsi purpurea (Hawker-Smith, 1933)
Mimeresia neavei (Joicey & Talbot, 1921)
Mimeresia russulus unyoro Stempffer, 1961
Liptena albomacula Hawker-Smith, 1933
Liptena amabilis nyanzae Congdon, Kielland & Collins, 1998
Liptena augusta Suffert, 1904
Liptena batesana Bethune-Baker, 1926
Liptena congoana Hawker-Smith, 1933
Liptena despecta (Holland, 1890)
Liptena eukrinoides Talbot, 1937
Liptena flavicans aequatorialis Stempffer, 1956
Liptena flavicans katera Stempffer, 1956
Liptena hapale Talbot, 1935
Liptena modesta (Kirby, 1890)
Liptena nigromarginata Stempffer, 1961
Liptena opaca ugandana Stempffer, Bennett & May, 1974
Liptena orubrum teroana Talbot, 1935
Liptena praestans congoensis Schultze, 1923
Liptena rubromacula jacksoni Carpenter, 1934
Liptena turbata (Kirby, 1890)
Liptena xanthostola xantha (Grose-Smith, 1901)
Kakumia ideoides (Dewitz, 1887)
Kakumia otlauga (Grose-Smith & Kirby, 1890)
Tetrarhanis ilala (Riley, 1929)
Tetrarhanis ilma daltoni (Poulton, 1929)
Tetrarhanis ilma ugandae (Stempffer, 1964)
Tetrarhanis stempfferi kigezi (Stempffer, 1956)
Falcuna iturina Stempffer & Bennett, 1963
Falcuna orientalis orientalis (Bethune-Baker, 1906)
Falcuna orientalis bwamba Stempffer & Bennett, 1963
Falcuna overlaeti Stempffer & Bennett, 1963
Larinopoda lagyra (Hewitson, 1866)
Larinopoda lircaea (Hewitson, 1866)
Larinopoda tera (Hewitson, 1873)
Micropentila bunyoro Stempffer & Bennett, 1965
Micropentila cherereti Stempffer & Bennett, 1965
Micropentila fontainei Stempffer & Bennett, 1965
Micropentila jacksoni Talbot, 1937
Micropentila katerae Stempffer & Bennett, 1965
Micropentila mpigi Stempffer & Bennett, 1965
Micropentila subplagata Bethune-Baker, 1915
Micropentila ugandae Hawker-Smith, 1933
Micropentila victoriae Stempffer & Bennett, 1965
Pseuderesia eleaza katera Stempffer, 1961
Pseuderesia mapongua (Holland, 1893)
Eresina bergeri Stempffer, 1956
Eresina bilinea Talbot, 1935
Eresina conradti Stempffer, 1956
Eresina crola Talbot, 1935
Eresina fontainei Stempffer, 1956
Eresina jacksoni Stempffer, 1961
Eresina katera Stempffer, 1962
Eresina masaka Stempffer, 1962
Eresina rougeoti Stempffer, 1956
Eresina toroensis Joicey & Talbot, 1921
Eresiomera magnimacula (Rebel, 1914)
Eresiomera paradoxa orientalis (Stempffer, 1962)
Eresiomera rougeoti (Stempffer, 1961)
Eresiomera rutilo (Druce, 1910)
Citrinophila erastus pallida Hawker-Smith, 1933
Citrinophila tenera (Kirby, 1887)
Citrinophila unipunctata Bethune-Baker, 1908
Argyrocheila inundifera Hawker-Smith, 1933
Argyrocheila ugandae Hawker-Smith, 1933

Epitolini
Toxochitona ankole Stempffer, 1967 (endemic)
Toxochitona gerda (Kirby, 1890)
Toxochitona sankuru Stempffer, 1961
Toxochitona vansomereni (Stempffer, 1954) (endemic)
Iridana bwamba Stempffer, 1964 (endemic)
Iridana hypocala Eltringham, 1929
Iridana incredibilis (Staudinger, 1891)
Iridana jacksoni Stempffer, 1964
Iridana katera Stempffer, 1964
Iridana marina Talbot, 1935
Iridana obscura Stempffer, 1964 (endemic)
Iridana perdita (Kirby, 1890)
Iridana tororo Stempffer, 1964
Iridana unyoro Stempffer, 1964
Teratoneura congoensis Stempffer, 1954
Epitola urania Kirby, 1887
Epitola uranioides uranoides Libert, 1999
Cerautola ceraunia (Hewitson, 1873)
Cerautola crippsi (Stoneham, 1934)
Cerautola crowleyi holochroma (Berger, 1981)
Cerautola miranda vidua (Talbot, 1935)
Cerautola semibrunnea (Bethune-Baker, 1916)
Geritola cyanea (Jackson, 1964)
Geritola dubia (Jackson, 1964)
Geritola gerina (Hewitson, 1878)
Geritola goodii (Holland, 1890)
Geritola liana (Roche, 1954)
Geritola zelica (Kirby, 1890)
Geritola subargentea (Jackson, 1964)
Stempfferia badura contrasta Libert, 1999
Stempfferia carilla (Roche, 1954) (endemic)
Stempfferia cercene (Hewitson, 1873)
Stempfferia cercenoides (Holland, 1890)
Stempfferia ciconia mongiro (Jackson, 1968)
Stempfferia insulana (Aurivillius, 1923)
Stempfferia mara (Talbot, 1935)
Stempfferia marginata (Kirby, 1887)
Stempfferia sylviae Libert, 1999
Cephetola bwamba (Jackson, 1964) (endemic)
Cephetola catuna catuna (Kirby, 1890)
Cephetola catuna carpenteri (Bethune-Baker, 1922)
Cephetola cephena entebbeana (Bethune-Baker, 1926)
Cephetola dolorosa (Roche, 1954)
Cephetola kamengensis (Jackson, 1962)
Cephetola katerae (Jackson, 1962)
Cephetola kiellandi (Libert & Congdon, 1998)
Cephetola maculata (Hawker-Smith, 1926)
Cephetola mariae Libert, 1999
Cephetola martini (Libert, 1998)
Cephetola mengoensis (Bethune-Baker, 1906)
Cephetola mpangensis (Jackson, 1962)
Cephetola nigra (Bethune-Baker, 1903)
Cephetola orientalis (Roche, 1954)
Cephetola pinodes budduana (Talbot, 1937)
Cephetola subgriseata (Jackson, 1964)
Cephetola sublustris (Bethune-Baker, 1904)
Cephetola vinalli (Talbot, 1935)
Cephetola viridana (Joicey & Talbot, 1921)
Deloneura ochrascens (Neave, 1904)
Neaveia lamborni orientalis Jackson, 1962
Epitolina dispar (Kirby, 1887)
Epitolina melissa (Druce, 1888)
Epitolina catori ugandae Jackson, 1962
Hypophytala vansomereni (Jackson, 1964)
Phytala elais ugandae Jackson, 1964
Neoepitola barombiensis (Kirby, 1890)
Aethiopana honorius (Fabricius, 1793)
Hewitsonia inexpectata Bouyer, 1997
Hewitsonia kuehnei Collins & Larsen, 2008
Hewitsonia intermedia Jackson, 1962
Hewitsonia ugandae Jackson, 1962
Powellana cottoni Bethune-Baker, 1908

Aphnaeinae
Pseudaletis agrippina Druce, 1888
Pseudaletis busoga van Someren, 1939
Pseudaletis antimachus (Staudinger, 1888)
Lipaphnaeus aderna pan (Talbot, 1935)
Lipaphnaeus leonina paradoxa (Schultze, 1908)
Lipaphnaeus leonina loxura (Rebel, 1914)
Chloroselas esmeralda Butler, 1886
Chloroselas pseudozeritis umbrosa Jackson, 1966
Cigaritis apelles (Oberthür, 1878)
Cigaritis avriko (Karsch, 1893)
Cigaritis brunnea (Jackson, 1966)
Cigaritis crustaria (Holland, 1890)
Cigaritis homeyeri (Dewitz, 1887)
Cigaritis nilus (Hewitson, 1865)
Cigaritis nyassae (Butler, 1884)
Cigaritis tavetensis (Lathy, 1906)
Zeritis neriene Boisduval, 1836
Axiocerses harpax ugandana Clench, 1963
Axiocerses amanga (Westwood, 1881)
Aphnaeus argyrocyclus Holland, 1890
Aphnaeus chapini ugandae Stempffer, 1961
Aphnaeus coronae Talbot, 1935
Aphnaeus gilloni Stempffer, 1966
Aphnaeus jacksoni Stempffer, 1954
Aphnaeus jefferyi Hawker-Smith, 1928
Aphnaeus nyanzae Stempffer, 1954 (endemic)
Aphnaeus orcas (Drury, 1782)

Theclinae
Myrina sharpei Bethune-Baker, 1906
Myrina silenus (Fabricius, 1775)
Myrina subornata Lathy, 1903
Oxylides albata (Aurivillius, 1895)
Oxylides feminina (Sharpe, 1904)
Dapidodigma demeter nuptus Clench, 1961
Hypolycaena antifaunus latimacula (Joicey & Talbot, 1921)
Hypolycaena dubia Aurivillius, 1895
Hypolycaena hatita ugandae Sharpe, 1904
Hypolycaena jacksoni Bethune-Baker, 1906
Hypolycaena kadiskos Druce, 1890
Hypolycaena lebona davenporti Larsen, 1997
Hypolycaena liara Druce, 1890
Hypolycaena obscura Stempffer, 1947
Hypolycaena nigra Bethune-Baker, 1914
Hypolycaena pachalica Butler, 1888
Leptomyrina makala Bethune-Baker, 1908
Leptomyrina gorgias cana Talbot, 1935
Iolaus bolissus aurora Clench, 1964
Iolaus alienus ugandae Stempffer, 1953
Iolaus aurivillii Röber, 1900
Iolaus bansana yalae (Riley, 1928)
Iolaus bellina exquisita (Riley, 1928)
Iolaus creta Hewitson, 1878
Iolaus farquharsoni (Bethune-Baker, 1922)
Iolaus fontainei (Stempffer, 1956)
Iolaus hemicyanus Sharpe, 1904
Iolaus iasis albomaculatus Sharpe, 1904
Iolaus maesa (Hewitson, 1862)
Iolaus mafugae (Stempffer & Bennett, 1959)
Iolaus mimosae haemus (Talbot, 1935)
Iolaus mongiro Stempffer, 1969 (endemic)
Iolaus nasisii (Riley, 1928)
Iolaus neavei katera Talbot, 1937
Iolaus pollux albocaerulea (Riley, 1929)
Iolaus pseudofrater Stempffer, 1962 (endemic)
Iolaus pseudopollux Stempffer, 1962 (endemic)
Iolaus scintillans Aurivillius, 1905
Iolaus sibella (Druce, 1910)
Iolaus sidus Trimen, 1864
Iolaus stenogrammica (Riley, 1928)
Iolaus tajoraca Walker, 1870
Iolaus trimeni Wallengren, 1875
Iolaus menas tatiana (d'Abrera, 1980)
Iolaus henryi (Stempffer, 1961)
Iolaus gabunica (Riley, 1928)
Iolaus iulus Hewitson, 1869
Iolaus jamesoni (Druce, 1891)
Iolaus parasilanus divaricatus (Riley, 1928)
Iolaus ismenias (Klug, 1834)
Iolaus vansomereni (Stempffer & Bennett, 1958) (endemic)
Iolaus poecilaon (Riley, 1928)
Iolaus aequatorialis (Stempffer & Bennett, 1958)
Iolaus cottrelli (Stempffer & Bennett, 1958)
Iolaus crawshayi elgonae (Stempffer & Bennett, 1958)
Iolaus crawshayi niloticus (Stempffer & Bennett, 1958)
Iolaus iturensis (Joicey & Talbot, 1921)
Iolaus kayonza (Stempffer & Bennett, 1958) (endemic)
Iolaus lalos kigezi (Stempffer & Bennett, 1958)
Iolaus timon orientius Hulstaert, 1924
Iolaus catori cottoni Bethune-Baker, 1908
Stugeta marmoreus marmoreus (Butler, 1866)
Stugeta marmoreus olalae Stoneham, 1934
Pilodeudorix baginei (Collins & Larsen, 1991)
Pilodeudorix ula (Karsch, 1895)
Pilodeudorix virgata (Druce, 1891)
Pilodeudorix anetia (Hulstaert, 1924)
Pilodeudorix aruma pallidior Libert, 2004
Pilodeudorix azurea (Stempffer, 1964)
Pilodeudorix canescens (Joicey & Talbot, 1921)
Pilodeudorix infuscata (Stempffer, 1964)
Pilodeudorix leonina indentata Libert, 2004
Pilodeudorix mera mera (Hewitson, 1873
Pilodeudorix mera kinumbensis (Dufrane, 1945)
Pilodeudorix nyanzana (Stempffer, 1957)
Pilodeudorix otraeda genuba (Hewitson, 1875)
Pilodeudorix ankoleensis (Stempffer, 1953) (endemic)
Pilodeudorix camerona katanga (Clench, 1965)
Pilodeudorix congoana orientalis (Stempffer, 1957)
Pilodeudorix kohli (Aurivillius, 1921)
Pilodeudorix zela (Hewitson, 1869)
Pilodeudorix zeloides (Butler, 1901)
Pilodeudorix zelomina (Rebel, 1914)
Pilodeudorix hugoi Libert, 2004
Pilodeudorix deritas (Hewitson, 1874)
Pilodeudorix fumata (Stempffer, 1954)
Pilodeudorix pasteon (Druce, 1910)
Pilodeudorix pseudoderitas (Stempffer, 1964)
Pilodeudorix violetta (Aurivillius, 1897)
Paradeudorix cobaltina (Stempffer, 1964)
Paradeudorix ituri ugandae (Talbot, 1935)
Paradeudorix marginata (Stempffer, 1962)
Hypomyrina nomenia extensa Libert, 2004
Hypomyrina mimetica Libert, 2004
Hypomyrina fournierae Gabriel, 1939
Deudorix caliginosa Lathy, 1903
Deudorix dinochares Grose-Smith, 1887
Deudorix dinomenes diomedes Jackson, 1966
Deudorix diocles Hewitson, 1869
Deudorix edwardsi Gabriel, 1939
Deudorix jacksoni Talbot, 1935
Deudorix kayonza Stempffer, 1956
Deudorix livia (Klug, 1834)
Deudorix lorisona lorisona (Hewitson, 1862)
Deudorix lorisona baronica Ungemach, 1932
Deudorix lorisona sesse Stempffer & Jackson, 1962
Deudorix odana Druce, 1887
Deudorix suk Stempffer, 1948
Capys catharus rileyi Stempffer, 1967

Polyommatinae

Lycaenesthini
Anthene afra (Bethune-Baker, 1910)
Anthene alberta (Bethune-Baker, 1910)
Anthene butleri (Oberthür, 1880)
Anthene contrastata mashuna (Stevenson, 1937)
Anthene contrastata turkana Stempffer, 1936
Anthene crawshayi crawshayi (Butler, 1899)
Anthene crawshayi minuta (Bethune-Baker, 1916)
Anthene definita (Butler, 1899)
Anthene hobleyi elgonensis (Aurivillius, 1925)
Anthene hobleyi kigezi Stempffer, 1961
Anthene hodsoni (Talbot, 1935)
Anthene indefinita (Bethune-Baker, 1910)
Anthene irumu (Stempffer, 1948)
Anthene ituria (Bethune-Baker, 1910)
Anthene kampala (Bethune-Baker, 1910)
Anthene katera Talbot, 1937
Anthene kersteni (Gerstaecker, 1871)
Anthene lachares toroensis Stempffer, 1947
Anthene larydas (Cramer, 1780)
Anthene ligures (Hewitson, 1874)
Anthene liodes (Hewitson, 1874)
Anthene kikuyu (Bethune-Baker, 1910)
Anthene rubricinctus jeanneli Stempffer, 1961
Anthene ruwenzoricus (Grünberg, 1911)
Anthene schoutedeni (Hulstaert, 1924)
Anthene scintillula (Holland, 1891)
Anthene sylvanus albicans (Grünberg, 1910)
Anthene talboti Stempffer, 1936
Anthene wilsoni (Talbot, 1935)
Anthene zenkeri (Karsch, 1895)
Anthene kalinzu (Stempffer, 1950)
Anthene quadricaudata (Bethune-Baker, 1926)
Anthene chryseostictus (Bethune-Baker, 1910)
Anthene gemmifera (Neave, 1910)
Anthene lusones (Hewitson, 1874)
Anthene staudingeri (Grose-Smith & Kirby, 1894)
Anthene hades (Bethune-Baker, 1910)
Anthene inconspicua (Druce, 1910)
Anthene kamilila (Bethune-Baker, 1910)
Anthene lamias katerae (d'Abrera, 1980)
Anthene lucretilis albipicta (Talbot, 1935)
Anthene nigeriae (Aurivillius, 1905)
Anthene rufoplagata (Bethune-Baker, 1910)
Cupidesthes arescopa orientalis (Stempffer, 1962)
Cupidesthes eliasi Congdon, Kielland & Collins, 1998
Cupidesthes leonina (Bethune-Baker, 1903)
Cupidesthes lithas (Druce, 1890)
Cupidesthes ysobelae Jackson, 1966
Lycaena phlaeas ethiopica (Poulton, 1922)

Polyommatini
Cupidopsis jobates (Hopffer, 1855)
Pseudonacaduba aethiops (Mabille, 1877)
Uranothauma antinorii felthami (Stevenson, 1934)
Uranothauma cordatus (Sharpe, 1892)
Uranothauma cuneatum Tite, 1958
Uranothauma delatorum Heron, 1909
Uranothauma falkensteini (Dewitz, 1879)
Uranothauma heritsia intermedia (Tite, 1958)
Uranothauma lunifer (Rebel, 1914)
Uranothauma poggei (Dewitz, 1879)
Phlyaria cyara tenuimarginata (Grünberg, 1908)
Cacyreus audeoudi Stempffer, 1936
Cacyreus tespis (Herbst, 1804)
Cacyreus virilis Stempffer, 1936
Harpendyreus marungensis wollastoni (Bethune-Baker, 1926)
Harpendyreus reginaldi Heron, 1909
Leptotes marginalis (Stempffer, 1944)
Tuxentius cretosus usemia (Neave, 1904)
Tuxentius margaritaceus (Sharpe, 1892)
Tarucus balkanicus (Freyer, 1843)
Tarucus legrasi Stempffer, 1948
Tarucus rosacea (Austaut, 1885)
Tarucus theophrastus (Fabricius, 1793)
Tarucus ungemachi Stempffer, 1942
Actizera stellata (Trimen, 1883)
Azanus isis (Drury, 1773)
Azanus natalensis (Trimen & Bowker, 1887)
Eicochrysops distractus (de Joannis & Verity, 1913)
Eicochrysops masai (Bethune-Baker, 1905)
Eicochrysops messapus nandiana (Bethune-Baker, 1906)
Euchrysops alberta (Butler, 1901)
Euchrysops albistriata (Capronnier, 1889)
Euchrysops barkeri (Trimen, 1893)
Euchrysops brunneus Bethune-Baker, 1923
Euchrysops crawshayi (Butler, 1899)
Euchrysops kabrosae (Bethune-Baker, 1906)
Euchrysops nilotica (Aurivillius, 1904)
Euchrysops osiris (Hopffer, 1855)
Euchrysops reducta Hulstaert, 1924
Euchrysops severini Hulstaert, 1924
Euchrysops subpallida Bethune-Baker, 1923
Thermoniphas alberici (Dufrane, 1945)
Thermoniphas albocaerulea Stempffer, 1956 (endemic)
Thermoniphas caerulea Stempffer, 1956 (endemic)
Thermoniphas distincta (Talbot, 1935)
Thermoniphas fumosa Stempffer, 1952
Thermoniphas plurilimbata plurilimbata Karsch, 1895
Thermoniphas plurilimbata rutshurensis (Joicey & Talbot, 1921)
Thermoniphas togara togara (Plötz, 1880)
Thermoniphas togara bugalla Stempffer & Jackson, 1962
Thermoniphas kigezi Stempffer, 1956 (endemic)
Oboronia albicosta (Gaede, 1916)
Oboronia guessfeldti (Dewitz, 1879)
Oboronia ornata vestalis (Aurivillius, 1895)
Oboronia pseudopunctatus (Strand, 1912)
Oboronia punctatus (Dewitz, 1879)
Chilades naidina (Butler, 1886)
Lepidochrysops budama van Someren, 1957 (endemic)
Lepidochrysops jacksoni van Someren, 1957 (endemic)
Lepidochrysops labwor van Someren, 1957 (endemic)
Lepidochrysops loveni (Aurivillius, 1922)
Lepidochrysops neonegus borealis van Someren, 1957
Lepidochrysops polydialecta (Bethune-Baker, [1923])
Lepidochrysops pterou (Bethune-Baker, [1923])
Lepidochrysops victoriae occidentalis Libert & Collins, 2001

Riodinidae

Nemeobiinae
Abisara caeca Rebel, 1914
Abisara rutherfordii cyclops Riley, 1932
Abisara rogersi simulacris Riley, 1932
Abisara neavei Riley, 1932

Nymphalidae

Libytheinae
Libythea labdaca Westwood, 1851

Danainae

Danaini
Danaus chrysippus chrysippus (Linnaeus, 1758)
Danaus chrysippus alcippus (Cramer, 1777)
Danaus chrysippus orientis (Aurivillius, 1909)
Danaus dorippus (Klug, 1845)
Tirumala formosa mercedonia (Karsch, 1894)
Amauris niavius niavius (Linnaeus, 1758)
Amauris niavius aethiops Rothschild & Jordan, 1903
Amauris tartarea Mabille, 1876
Amauris albimaculata magnimacula Rebel, 1914
Amauris crawshayi oscarus Thurau, 1904
Amauris echeria jacksoni Sharpe, 1892
Amauris echeria mongallensis Carpenter, 1928
Amauris echeria terrena Talbot, 1940
Amauris ellioti ellioti Butler, 1895
Amauris ellioti ansorgei Sharpe, 1896
Amauris hecate (Butler, 1866)
Amauris inferna grogani Sharpe, 1901
Amauris inferna uganda Talbot, 1940

Satyrinae

Elymniini
Elymniopsis bammakoo rattrayi (Sharpe, 1902)

Melanitini
Gnophodes betsimena parmeno Doubleday, 1849
Gnophodes chelys (Fabricius, 1793)
Gnophodes grogani Sharpe, 1901
Melanitis ansorgei Rothschild, 1904
Melanitis libya Distant, 1882
Aphysoneura pigmentaria pringlei (Sharpe, 1894)
Aphysoneura scapulifascia kigeziae Kielland, 1989

Satyrini
Bicyclus alboplaga (Rebel, 1914)
Bicyclus analis (Aurivillius, 1895)
Bicyclus angulosa (Butler, 1868)
Bicyclus anynana centralis Condamin, 1968
Bicyclus auricruda fulgidus Fox, 1963
Bicyclus aurivillii (Butler, 1896)
Bicyclus buea (Strand, 1912)
Bicyclus campus (Karsch, 1893)
Bicyclus dentata (Sharpe, 1898)
Bicyclus dubia (Aurivillius, 1893)
Bicyclus ena (Hewitson, 1877)
Bicyclus golo (Aurivillius, 1893)
Bicyclus graueri (Rebel, 1914)
Bicyclus hyperanthus (Bethune-Baker, 1908)
Bicyclus iccius (Hewitson, 1865)
Bicyclus ignobilis acutus Condamin, 1965
Bicyclus istaris (Plötz, 1880)
Bicyclus jefferyi Fox, 1963
Bicyclus kenia (Rogenhofer, 1891)
Bicyclus mandanes Hewitson, 1873
Bicyclus matuta (Karsch, 1894)
Bicyclus mesogena ugandae (Riley, 1926)
Bicyclus milyas (Hewitson, 1864)
Bicyclus mollitia (Karsch, 1895)
Bicyclus nachtetis Condamin, 1965
Bicyclus neustetteri (Rebel, 1914)
Bicyclus pavonis (Butler, 1876)
Bicyclus persimilis (Joicey & Talbot, 1921)
Bicyclus procora (Karsch, 1893)
Bicyclus rhacotis (Hewitson, 1866)
Bicyclus sambulos cyaneus Condamin, 1961
Bicyclus martius sanaos (Hewitson, 1866)
Bicyclus sandace (Hewitson, 1877)
Bicyclus saussurei angustus Condamin, 1970
Bicyclus sebetus (Hewitson, 1877)
Bicyclus smithi (Aurivillius, 1899)
Bicyclus sophrosyne (Plötz, 1880)
Bicyclus trilophus jacksoni Condamin, 1961
Bicyclus vulgaris (Butler, 1868)
Bicyclus xeneoides Condamin, 1961
Heteropsis perspicua (Trimen, 1873)
Heteropsis phaea (Karsch, 1894)
Heteropsis teratia (Karsch, 1894)
Heteropsis ubenica ugandica (Kielland, 1994)
Heteropsis peitho reducta (Libert, 2006)
Ypthima albida Butler, 1888
Ypthima antennata van Son, 1955
Ypthima condamini Kielland, 1982
Ypthima doleta Kirby, 1880
Ypthima granulosa Butler, 1883
Ypthima pupillaris Butler, 1888
Ypthima recta Overlaet, 1955
Neocoenyra duplex Butler, 1886
Neocoenyra fulleborni Thurau, 1903

Charaxinae

Charaxini
Charaxes fulvescens monitor Rothschild, 1900
Charaxes acuminatus kigezia van Someren, 1963
Charaxes protoclea nothodes Jordan, 1911
Charaxes boueti rectans Rothschild & Jordan, 1903
Charaxes cynthia kinduana Le Cerf, 1923
Charaxes cynthia parvicaudatus Lathy, 1925
Charaxes lucretius maximus van Someren, 1971
Charaxes lactetinctus Karsch, 1892
Charaxes saturnus Butler, 1865
Charaxes epijasius
Charaxes hansali baringana Rothschild, 1905
Charaxes castor (Cramer, 1775)
Charaxes brutus angustus Rothschild, 1900
Charaxes ansorgei ansorgei Rothschild, 1897
Charaxes ansorgei ruandana Talbot, 1932
Charaxes pollux (Cramer, 1775)
Charaxes druceanus obscura Rebel, 1914
Charaxes druceanus septentrionalis Lathy, 1925
Charaxes eudoxus cabacus Jordan, 1925
Charaxes eudoxus katerae Carpenter, 1937
Charaxes eudoxus mechowi Rothschild, 1900
Charaxes numenes aequatorialis van Someren, 1972
Charaxes tiridates tiridatinus Röber, 1936
Charaxes bipunctatus ugandensis van Someren, 1972
Charaxes smaragdalis caerulea Jackson, 1951
Charaxes smaragdalis elgonae van Someren, 1964
Charaxes smaragdalis metu van Someren, 1964
Charaxes smaragdalis toro van Someren, 1964
Charaxes xiphares burgessi van Son, 1953
Charaxes imperialis ugandicus van Someren, 1972
Charaxes ameliae victoriae van Someren, 1972
Charaxes pythodoris Hewitson, 1873
Charaxes hadrianus Ward, 1871
Charaxes nobilis Druce, 1873
Charaxes fournierae kigeziensis Howarth, 1969
Charaxes zingha (Stoll, 1780)
Charaxes etesipe etesipe (Godart, 1824)
Charaxes etesipe hercules Turlin & Lequeux, 2002
Charaxes achaemenes monticola van Someren, 1970
Charaxes jahlusa ganalensis Carpenter, 1937
Charaxes eupale latimargo Joicey & Talbot, 1921
Charaxes subornatus minor Joicey & Talbot, 1921
Charaxes dilutus ngonga van Someren, 1974
Charaxes montis Jackson, 1956
Charaxes anticlea adusta Rothschild, 1900
Charaxes baumanni bwamba van Someren, 1971
Charaxes baumanni didingensis van Someren, 1971
Charaxes baumanni interposita van Someren, 1971
Charaxes opinatus Heron, 1909
Charaxes hildebrandti hildebrandti (Dewitz, 1879)
Charaxes hildebrandti katangensis Talbot, 1928
Charaxes virilis lenis Henning, 1989
Charaxes catachrous van Someren & Jackson, 1952
Charaxes etheocles carpenteri van Someren & Jackson, 1957
Charaxes ethalion nyanzae van Someren, 1967
Charaxes mafuga van Someren, 1969
Charaxes cedreatis Hewitson, 1874
Charaxes phaeus Hewitson, 1877
Charaxes viola picta van Someren & Jackson, 1952
Charaxes kirki suk Carpenter & Jackson, 1950
Charaxes pleione bebra Rothschild, 1900
Charaxes paphianus subpallida Joicey & Talbot, 1925
Charaxes kahldeni Homeyer & Dewitz, 1882
Charaxes zoolina zoolina (Westwood, [1850])
Charaxes zoolina mafugensis Jackson, 1956
Charaxes nichetes nichetes Grose-Smith, 1883
Charaxes nichetes ssese Turlin & Lequeux, 2002
Charaxes lycurgus bernardiana Plantrou, 1978
Charaxes zelica depuncta Joicey & Talbot, 1921
Charaxes porthos dummeri Joicey & Talbot, 1922
Charaxes schiltzei Bouyer, 1991

Euxanthini
Euxanthe eurinome ansellica (Butler, 1870)
Euxanthe eurinome birbirica Ungemach, 1932
Euxanthe crossleyi ansorgei (Rothschild, 1903)
Euxanthe crossleyi magnifica (Rebel, 1914)
 Euxanthe trajanus vansomereni (Poulton, 1929)

Pallini
Palla ussheri interposita Joicey & Talbot, 1925
Palla violinitens bwamba van Someren, 1975

Apaturinae
Apaturopsis cleochares (Hewitson, 1873)

Nymphalinae
Kallimoides rumia rattrayi (Sharpe, 1904)
Vanessula milca latifasciata Joicey & Talbot, 1928

Nymphalini
Antanartia delius (Drury, 1782)
Antanartia schaeneia dubia Howarth, 1966
Vanessa dimorphica (Howarth, 1966)
Vanessa abyssinica vansomereni Howarth, 1966
Junonia chorimene (Guérin-Méneville, 1844)
Junonia schmiedeli (Fiedler, 1920)
Junonia sophia infracta Butler, 1888
Junonia gregorii Butler, 1896
Junonia terea tereoides (Butler, 1901)
Junonia westermanni suffusa (Rothschild & Jordan, 1903)
Junonia ansorgei (Rothschild, 1899)
Junonia cymodoce lugens (Schultze, 1912)
Salamis cacta (Fabricius, 1793)
Protogoniomorpha parhassus (Drury, 1782)
Protogoniomorpha temora (Felder & Felder, 1867)
Precis actia Distant, 1880
Precis archesia ugandensis (McLeod, 1980)
Precis ceryne (Boisduval, 1847)
Precis coelestina Dewitz, 1879
Precis milonia wintgensi Strand, 1909
Precis octavia sesamus Trimen, 1883
Precis pelarga (Fabricius, 1775)
Precis rauana rauana (Grose-Smith, 1898)
Precis rauana silvicola Schultz, 1916
Precis sinuata hecqui Berger, 1981
Precis tugela pyriformis (Butler, 1896)
Hypolimnas bartelotti Grose-Smith, 1890
Hypolimnas dinarcha grandis Rothschild, 1918
Hypolimnas misippus (Linnaeus, 1764)
Hypolimnas monteironis major Rothschild, 1918
Hypolimnas salmacis salmacis (Drury, 1773)
Hypolimnas salmacis magnifica Rothschild, 1918
Mallika jacksoni (Sharpe, 1896)

Cyrestinae

Cyrestini
Cyrestis camillus (Fabricius, 1781)

Biblidinae

Biblidini
Byblia anvatara crameri Aurivillius, 1894
Mesoxantha ethosea reducta Rothschild, 1918
Ariadne albifascia (Joicey & Talbot, 1921)
Ariadne enotrea suffusa (Joicey & Talbot, 1921)
Ariadne pagenstecheri (Suffert, 1904)
Neptidopsis ophione nucleata Grünberg, 1911
Eurytela dryope angulata Aurivillius, 1899
Eurytela hiarbas (Drury, 1782)

Epicaliini
Sevenia boisduvali omissa (Rothschild, 1918)
Sevenia garega (Karsch, 1892)
Sevenia occidentalium (Mabille, 1876)
Sevenia umbrina (Karsch, 1892)

Limenitinae

Limenitidini
Harma theobene superna (Fox, 1968)
Cymothoe beckeri theodosia Staudinger, 1890
Cymothoe caenis (Drury, 1773)
Cymothoe distincta kivuensis Overlaet, 1952
Cymothoe confusa Aurivillius, 1887
Cymothoe haynae diphyia Karsch, 1894
Cymothoe herminia johnstoni (Butler, 1902)
Cymothoe hobarti Butler, 1900
Cymothoe indamora amorinda van Someren, 1939
Cymothoe jodutta mostinckxi Overlaet, 1952
Cymothoe lurida butleri Grünberg, 1908
Cymothoe lurida tristis Overlaet, 1952
Cymothoe ochreata Grose-Smith, 1890
Cymothoe reginaeelisabethae Holland, 1920
Kumothales inexpectata Overlaet, 1940
Pseudoneptis bugandensis bugandensis Stoneham, 1935
Pseudoneptis bugandensis ianthe Hemming, 1964
Pseudacraea boisduvalii (Doubleday, 1845)
Pseudacraea clarkii Butler & Rothschild, 1892
Pseudacraea deludens echerioides Talbot, 1941
Pseudacraea deludens terrena Jackson, 1956
Pseudacraea dolomena albostriata Lathy, 1906
Pseudacraea dolomena elgonensis Jackson, 1951
Pseudacraea dolomena kayonza Jackson, 1956
Pseudacraea rubrobasalis Aurivillius, 1903
Pseudacraea eurytus (Linnaeus, 1758)
Pseudacraea kuenowii burgessi Jackson, 1951
Pseudacraea kuenowii hypoxantha Jordan, 1911
Pseudacraea kuenowii kigezi Jackson, 1956
Pseudacraea lucretia protracta (Butler, 1874)
Pseudacraea semire (Cramer, 1779)
Pseudacraea warburgi Aurivillius, 1892

Neptidini
Neptis agouale parallela Collins & Larsen, 1996
Neptis alta Overlaet, 1955
Neptis carpenteri d'Abrera, 1980
Neptis clarei Neave, 1904
Neptis conspicua Neave, 1904
Neptis constantiae Carcasson, 1961
Neptis angusta Condamin, 1966
Neptis continuata Holland, 1892
Neptis exaleuca suffusa Rothschild, 1918
Neptis jordani Neave, 1910
Neptis kiriakoffi Overlaet, 1955
Neptis lugubris Rebel, 1914
Neptis melicerta (Drury, 1773)
Neptis metanira Holland, 1892
Neptis metella metella (Doubleday, 1848)
Neptis metella flavimacula Jackson, 1951
Neptis morosa Overlaet, 1955
Neptis nemetes nemetes Hewitson, 1868
Neptis nemetes margueriteae Fox, 1968
Neptis nicobule Holland, 1892
Neptis nicomedes Hewitson, 1874
Neptis quintilla Mabille, 1890
Neptis nicoteles Hewitson, 1874
Neptis occidentalis Rothschild, 1918
Neptis ochracea ochracea Neave, 1904
Neptis ochracea ochreata Gaede, 1915
Neptis poultoni Eltringham, 1921
Neptis puella Aurivillius, 1894
Neptis seeldrayersi Aurivillius, 1895
Neptis strigata kakamega Collins & Larsen, 1996
Neptis trigonophora melicertula Strand, 1912
Neptis woodwardi Sharpe, 1899

Adoliadini
Catuna angustatum (Felder & Felder, 1867)
Catuna crithea (Drury, 1773)
Euryphura chalcis (Felder & Felder, 1860)
Euryphura isuka Stoneham, 1935
Euryphura plautilla (Hewitson, 1865)
Pseudargynnis hegemone (Godart, 1819)
Aterica galene extensa Heron, 1909
Cynandra opis bernardii Lagnel, 1967
Euriphene amaranta (Karsch, 1894)
Euriphene atossa australis d'Abrera, 1980
Euriphene barombina (Aurivillius, 1894)
Euriphene butleri (Aurivillius, 1904)
Euriphene conjungens chalybeata (Talbot, 1937)
Euriphene excelsior (Rebel, 1911)
Euriphene jacksoni (Talbot, 1937)
Euriphene obsoleta (Grünberg, 1908)
Euriphene ribensis (Ward, 1871)
Euriphene saphirina (Karsch, 1894)
Euriphene tadema nigropunctata (Aurivillius, 1901)
Euriphene doriclea (Drury, 1782)
Bebearia carshena (Hewitson, 1871)
Bebearia absolon entebbiae (Lathy, 1906)
Bebearia zonara (Butler, 1871)
Bebearia mandinga beni Hecq, 1990
Bebearia oxione squalida (Talbot, 1928)
Bebearia abesa pandera Hecq, 1988
Bebearia partita (Aurivillius, 1895)
Bebearia barce maculata (Aurivillius, 1912)
Bebearia cocalia badiana (Rbel, 1914)
Bebearia cocalia katera (van Someren, 1939)
Bebearia sophus audeoudi (Riley, 1936)
Bebearia plistonax (Hewitson, 1874)
Bebearia brunhilda brunhilda (Kirby, 1889)
Bebearia brunhilda iturina (Karsch, 1894)
Bebearia laetitioides (Joicey & Talbot, 1921)
Bebearia laetitia (Plötz, 1880)
Bebearia flaminia (Staudinger, 1891)
Bebearia phantasiella simulata (van Someren, 1939)
Bebearia aurora kayonza (Jackson, 1956)
Bebearia chloeropis (Bethune-Baker, 1908)
Euphaedra medon fraudata van Someren, 1935
Euphaedra medon inaequabilis Thurau, 1904
Euphaedra zaddachii crawshayi Butler, 1895
Euphaedra christyi Sharpe, 1904 (endemic)
Euphaedra hewitsoni angusta Hecq, 1974
Euphaedra hollandi Hecq, 1974
Euphaedra diffusa Gaede, 1916
Euphaedra caerulescens Grose-Smith, 1890
Euphaedra imitans Holland, 1893
Euphaedra eberti hamus Berger, 1940
Euphaedra viridicaerulea nitidula van Someren, 1935
Euphaedra uganda Aurivillius, 1895
Euphaedra preussi Staudinger, 1891
Euphaedra vicina Hecq, 1984
Euphaedra procera Hecq, 1984
Euphaedra margueriteae Hecq, 1978
Euphaedra olivacea Grünberg, 1908 (endemic)
Euphaedra paradoxa Neave, 1904
Euphaedra eleus (Drury, 1782)
Euphaedra alacris Hecq, 1978
Euphaedra rattrayi Sharpe, 1904
Euphaedra edwardsii (van der Hoeven, 1845)
Euphaedra ruspina (Hewitson, 1865)
Euphaedra harpalyce spatiosa (Mabille, 1876)
Euphaedra harpalyce sudanensis Talbot, 1929
Euphaedra rex Stoneham, 1935
Euptera elabontas mweruensis Neave, 1910
Euptera hirundo hirundo Staudinger, 1891
Euptera hirundo lufirensis Joicey & Talbot, 1921
Euptera pluto primitiva Hancock, 1984
Pseudathyma cyrili Chovet, 2002
Pseudathyma neptidina Karsch, 1894
Pseudathyma nzoia van Someren, 1939
Pseudathyma plutonica Butler, 1902

Heliconiinae

Acraeini
Acraea cerasa cerita Sharpe, 1906
Acraea kraka pallida Carpenter, 1932
Acraea anemosa Hewitson, 1865
Acraea eltringhami Joicey & Talbot, 1921
Acraea endoscota Le Doux, 1928
Acraea eugenia Karsch, 1893
Acraea hamata Joicey & Talbot, 1922
Acraea insignis Distant, 1880
Acraea leucographa Ribbe, 1889
Acraea neobule Doubleday, 1847
Acraea quirina (Fabricius, 1781)
Acraea zetes (Linnaeus, 1758)
Acraea rudolfi Eltringham, 1929
Acraea abdera Hewitson, 1852
Acraea acrita Hewitson, 1865
Acraea cepheus (Linnaeus, 1758)
Acraea egina (Cramer, 1775)
Acraea guluensis Le Doux, 1932
Acraea asboloplintha Karsch, 1894
Acraea braesia Godman, 1885
Acraea caecilia (Fabricius, 1781)
Acraea doubledayi Guérin-Méneville, 1849
Acraea equatorialis Neave, 1904
Acraea leucopyga Aurivillius, 1904
Acraea natalica Boisduval, 1847
Acraea pseudegina Westwood, 1852
Acraea rogersi lankesteri Carpenter, 1941
Acraea sykesi Sharpe, 1902
Acraea aganice orientalis (Ungemach, 1932)
Acraea aganice ugandae (van Someren, 1936)
Acraea alcinoe camerunica (Aurivillius, 1893)
Acraea consanguinea albicolor (Karsch, 1895)
Acraea epaea angustifasciata (d'Abrera, 1980)
Acraea epaea lutosa (Suffert, 1904)
Acraea epaea paragea (Grose-Smith, 1900)
Acraea formosa (Butler, 1874)
Acraea macarista (Sharpe, 1906)
Acraea obliqua elgonense (Poulton, 1927)
Acraea obliqua kivuensis (Joicey & Talbot, 1927)
Acraea persanguinea (Rebel, 1914)
Acraea poggei nelsoni Grose-Smith & Kirby, 1892
Acraea pseuderyta Godman & Salvin, 1890
Acraea quadricolor latifasciata (Sharpe, 1892)
Acraea tellus eumelis (Jordan, 1910)
Acraea tellus schubotzi (Grünberg, 1911)
Acraea umbra hemileuca (Jordan, 1914)
Acraea alciope Hewitson, 1852
Acraea alciopoides Joicey & Talbot, 1921
Acraea alicia (Sharpe, 1890)
Acraea althoffi neavei Poulton, 1924
Acraea althoffi rubrofasciata Aurivillius, 1895
Acraea amicitiae Heron, 1909
Acraea ansorgei Grose-Smith, 1898
Acraea aurivillii Staudinger, 1896
Acraea baxteri philos Le Cerf, 1933
Acraea bonasia (Fabricius, 1775)
Acraea burgessi Jackson, 1956
Acraea cabira Hopffer, 1855
Acraea disjuncta disjuncta Grose-Smith, 1898
Acraea disjuncta kigeziensis Jackson, 1956
Acraea serena (Fabricius, 1775)
Acraea goetzei Thurau, 1903
Acraea grosvenori Eltringham, 1912
Acraea humilis Sharpe, 1897
Acraea iturina Grose-Smith, 1890
Acraea jodutta (Fabricius, 1793)
Acraea johnstoni Godman, 1885
Acraea toruna Grose-Smith, 1900
Acraea kalinzu Carpenter, 1936
Acraea lycoa Godart, 1819
Acraea orestia Hewitson, 1874
Acraea peneleos pelasgius Grose-Smith, 1900
Acraea pentapolis Ward, 1871
Acraea pharsalus Ward, 1871
Acraea rangatana bettiana Joicey & Talbot, 1921
Acraea sotikensis Sharpe, 1892
Acraea uvui Grose-Smith, 1890
Acraea ventura ochrascens Sharpe, 1902
Acraea vesperalis Grose-Smith, 1890
Acraea viviana Staudinger, 1896
Acraea anacreontica Grose-Smith, 1898
Acraea wigginsi Neave, 1904
Acraea cinerea Neave, 1904
Acraea melanoxantha Sharpe, 1891
Acraea ntebiae Sharpe, 1897
Acraea oreas Sharpe, 1891
Acraea orinata Oberthür, 1893
Acraea parrhasia servona Godart, 1819
Acraea penelope Staudinger, 1896
Acraea perenna Doubleday, 1847
Acraea quirinalis Grose-Smith, 1900
Acraea semivitrea Aurivillius, 1895
Acraea simulata Le Doux, 1923 (endemic)
Acraea bergeri Gaede, 1915 (endemic)

Argynnini
Issoria baumanni excelsior (Butler, 1896)

Vagrantini
Lachnoptera anticlia (Hübner, 1819)
Phalanta eurytis eurytis (Doubleday, 1847)
Phalanta eurytis microps (Rothschild & Jordan, 1903)
Phalanta phalantha aethiopica (Rothschild & Jordan, 1903)

Hesperiidae

Coeliadinae
Coeliades anchises (Gerstaecker, 1871)
Coeliades chalybe (Westwood, 1852)
Coeliades forestan (Stoll, [1782])
Coeliades hanno (Plötz, 1879)
Coeliades keithloa menelik (Ungemach, 1932)
Coeliades pisistratus (Fabricius, 1793)

Pyrginae

Celaenorrhinini
Celaenorrhinus bettoni Butler, 1902
Celaenorrhinus boadicea howarthi Berger, 1976
Celaenorrhinus homeyeri (Plötz, 1880)
Celaenorrhinus illustris daroa Evans, 1937
Celaenorrhinus intermixtus evansi Berger, 1975
Celaenorrhinus kivuensis Joicey & Talbot, 1921
Celaenorrhinus macrostictus Holland, 1893
Celaenorrhinus meditrina (Hewitson, 1877)
Celaenorrhinus nigropunctata Bethune-Baker, 1908
Celaenorrhinus ovalis Evans, 1937
Celaenorrhinus perlustris Rebel, 1914
Celaenorrhinus proxima (Mabille, 1877)
Celaenorrhinus toro Evans, 1937 (endemic)
Eretis buamba Evans, 1937
Eretis camerona Evans, 1937
Eretis herewardi Riley, 1921
Eretis lugens (Rogenhofer, 1891)
Eretis melania Mabille, 1891
Eretis mitiana Evans, 1937
Eretis umbra maculifera Mabille & Boullet, 1916
Eretis vaga Evans, 1937
Sarangesa astrigera Butler, 1894
Sarangesa bouvieri (Mabille, 1877)
Sarangesa brigida atra Evans, 1937
Sarangesa brigida sanaga Miller, 1964
Sarangesa haplopa Swinhoe, 1907
Sarangesa laelius (Mabille, 1877)
Sarangesa maculata (Mabille, 1891)
Sarangesa tertullianus (Fabricius, 1793)
Sarangesa thecla mabira Evans, 1956

Tagiadini
Tagiades flesus (Fabricius, 1781)
Eagris decastigma purpura Evans, 1937
Eagris lucetia (Hewitson, 1875)
Eagris nottoana (Wallengren, 1857)
Eagris sabadius astoria Holland, 1896
Eagris subalbida aurivillii (Neustetter, 1927)
Eagris tetrastigma (Mabille, 1891)
Eagris tigris tigris Evans, 1937
Eagris tigris kayonza Evans, 1956
Calleagris hollandi (Butler, 1897)
Calleagris lacteus (Mabille, 1877)
Procampta rara Holland, 1892
Caprona adelica Karsch, 1892
Netrobalane canopus (Trimen, 1864)
Abantis bismarcki Karsch, 1892
Abantis contigua Evans, 1937
Abantis efulensis Holland, 1896
Abantis leucogaster iruma Evans, 1951
Abantis lucretia etoumbiensis Miller, 1971
Abantis paradisea (Butler, 1870)

Carcharodini
Spialia colotes semiconfluens de Jong, 1978
Spialia colotes transvaaliae (Trimen & Bowker, 1889)
Spialia delagoae (Trimen, 1898)
Spialia depauperata (Strand, 1911)
Spialia mangana (Rebel, 1899)
Spialia ploetzi (Aurivillius, 1891)
Spialia wrefordi Evans, 1951
Spialia zebra bifida (Higgins, 1924)

Hesperiinae

Aeromachini
Astictopterus punctulata (Butler, 1895)
Prosopalpus saga Evans, 1937
Prosopalpus styla Evans, 1937
Kedestes brunneostriga (Plötz, 1884)
Kedestes callicles (Hewitson, 1868)
Kedestes mohozutza (Wallengren, 1857)
Kedestes protensa Butler, 1901
Kedestes rogersi Druce, 1907
Kedestes wallengrenii (Trimen, 1883)
Gorgyra afikpo Druce, 1909
Gorgyra aretina (Hewitson, 1878)
Gorgyra bibulus Riley, 1929
Gorgyra bina Evans, 1937
Gorgyra diversata Evans, 1937
Gorgyra kalinzu Evans, 1949
Gorgyra minima Holland, 1896
Gorgyra mocquerysii Holland, 1896
Gorgyra pali Evans, 1937
Teniorhinus ignita (Mabille, 1877)
Teniorhinus niger (Druce, 1910)
Ceratrichia argyrosticta enta Evans, 1947
Ceratrichia aurea Druce, 1910
Ceratrichia brunnea Bethune-Baker, 1906
Ceratrichia clara medea Evans, 1937
Ceratrichia hollandi Bethune-Baker, 1908
Ceratrichia mabirensis Riley, 1925
Ceratrichia semilutea Mabille, 1891
Ceratrichia semlikensis Joicey & Talbot, 1921
Ceratrichia wollastoni Heron, 1909
Pardaleodes bule Holland, 1896
Pardaleodes fan (Holland, 1894)
Pardaleodes incerta (Snellen, 1872)
Pardaleodes sator pusiella Mabille, 1877
Pardaleodes tibullus torensis Bethune-Baker, 1906
Xanthodisca astrape (Holland, 1892)
Xanthodisca vibius (Hewitson, 1878)
Rhabdomantis galatia (Hewitson, 1868)
Osmodes adonia Evans, 1937
Osmodes adosus (Mabille, 1890)
Osmodes costatus Aurivillius, 1896
Osmodes distincta Holland, 1896
Osmodes hollandi Evans, 1937
Osmodes laronia (Hewitson, 1868)
Osmodes lux Holland, 1892
Osmodes minchini Evans, 1937 (endemic)
Osmodes omar Swinhoe, 1916
Osmodes thora (Plötz, 1884)
Parosmodes morantii axis Evans, 1937
Parosmodes onza Evans, 1956 (endemic)
Paracleros biguttulus (Mabille, 1890)
Paracleros sangoanus (Carcasson, 1964)
Acleros mackenii instabilis Mabille, 1890
Acleros neavei Evans, 1937
Acleros nigrapex Strand, 1913
Acleros ploetzi Mabille, 1890
Semalea arela (Mabille, 1891)
Semalea pulvina (Plötz, 1879)
Semalea sextilis (Plötz, 1886)
Hypoleucis ophiusa ophir Evans, 1937
Hypoleucis sophia Evans, 1937
Hypoleucis tripunctata Mabille, 1891
Meza cybeutes (Holland, 1894)
Meza indusiata (Mabille, 1891)
Meza meza (Hewitson, 1877)
Paronymus budonga (Evans, 1938)
Paronymus xanthias kiellandi Congdon & Collins, 1998
Andronymus caesar philander (Hopffer, 1855)
Andronymus fenestrella Bethune-Baker, 1908
Andronymus gander Evans, 1947
Andronymus helles Evans, 1937
Andronymus marina Evans, 1937
Andronymus neander (Plötz, 1884)
Chondrolepis cynthia Evans, 1936
Chondrolepis leggei (Heron, 1909)
Chondrolepis niveicornis (Plötz, 1883)
Zophopetes ganda Evans, 1937
Zophopetes nobilior (Holland, 1896)
Gamia buchholzi (Plötz, 1879)
Gamia shelleyi (Sharpe, 1890)
Artitropa milleri Riley, 1925
Artitropa reducta Aurivillius, 1925
Mopala orma (Plötz, 1879)
Gretna balenge (Holland, 1891)
Gretna bugoma Evans, 1947 (endemic)
Gretna carmen Evans, 1937
Gretna cylinda (Hewitson, 1876)
Gretna waga (Plötz, 1886)
Gretna zaremba jacksoni Evans, 1937
Pteroteinon caenira (Hewitson, 1867)
Pteroteinon capronnieri (Plötz, 1879)
Pteroteinon ceucaenira (Druce, 1910)
Pteroteinon concaenira Belcastro & Larsen, 1996
Pteroteinon pruna Evans, 1937
Leona leonora (Plötz, 1879)
Leona halma Evans, 1937
Leona lissa lima Evans, 1937
Leona luehderi luehderi (Plötz, 1879)
Leona luehderi laura Evans, 1937
Caenides kangvensis Holland, 1896
Caenides xychus (Mabille, 1891)
Caenides dacela (Hewitson, 1876)
Caenides dacena (Hewitson, 1876)
Monza alberti (Holland, 1896)
Monza cretacea (Snellen, 1872)
Monza punctata crola Evans, 1937
Melphina flavina Lindsey & Miller, 1965
Melphina noctula (Druce, 1909)
Melphina unistriga (Holland, 1893)
Fresna carlo Evans, 1937
Fresna cojo (Karsch, 1893)
Fresna netopha (Hewitson, 1878)
Fresna nyassae (Hewitson, 1878)
Platylesches fosta Evans, 1937
Platylesches galesa (Hewitson, 1877)
Platylesches lamba Neave, 1910
Platylesches moritili (Wallengren, 1857)
Platylesches panga Evans, 1937
Platylesches picanini (Holland, 1894)
Platylesches rasta anka Evans, 1937
Platylesches tina Evans, 1937

Baorini
Zenonia crasta Evans, 1937
Borbo chagwa (Evans, 1937)
Borbo fallax (Gaede, 1916)
Borbo kaka (Evans, 1938)
Borbo lugens (Hopffer, 1855)
Borbo perobscura (Druce, 1912)
Borbo sirena (Evans, 1937)

Heteropterinae
Metisella abdeli abdeli (Krüger, 1928)
Metisella abdeli elgona Evans, 1938
Metisella alticola (Aurivillius, 1925)
Metisella formosus nyanza Evans, 1937
Metisella medea Evans, 1937
Metisella midas (Butler, 1894)
Metisella tsadicus (Aurivillius, 1905)
Metisella willemi (Wallengren, 1857)
Lepella lepeletier (Latreille, 1824)

See also
List of moths of Uganda
Wildlife of Uganda

References

Seitz, A. Die Gross-Schmetterlinge der Erde 13: Die Afrikanischen Tagfalter. Plates
Seitz, A. Die Gross-Schmetterlinge der Erde 13: Die Afrikanischen Tagfalter. Text 

Butterflies

Uganda
Uganda
Butterflies